Earth Star may refer to:
 Earth Star Diamond
 Earth star fungus or Geastrales, an order of mushrooms
 Cryptanthus or earth star, a genus in the botanical family Bromeliaceae
 Saturn or earth star
 Earth Star, a character in Toad Patrol

See also
 Earthstar (disambiguation)